This article is a summary of the closing milestones of the S&P 500 Index, a United States stock market index. Since first closing at 16.66 on January 3, 1950, the S&P 500 has increased, despite several periods of decline.

History

Standard & Poor's, initially known as the Standard Statistics Company, created its first stock market index in 1923. It consisted of 233 different stocks and was computed on a weekly basis. Three years later, it developed a 90 component composite price index that was computed on a daily basis; that was expanded over the years. On March 4, 1957, the Standard & Poor's 500 (.INX) (.SPX) was introduced.

Milestone highs 
 March 24, 2000: The S&P 500 index reaches an all-time intraday high of 1,552.87 during the dot-com bubble.
 October 9, 2007: Index closes at a record high of 1,565.15, the highest close prior to the financial crisis of 2007–2008. Two days later, the index hits an intraday record high of 1,576.09.  It did not regain this closing level until March 28, 2013.
 February 19, 2020: The S&P 500 index reached its highest point in the bull market that started from the low point on March 9, 2009, closing at 3386.15.
 August 18, 2020: The S&P 500 index closed at a record high of 3389.78 amid the ongoing COVID-19 pandemic in the United States.
 December 29, 2021: The S&P 500 index closed at a record high of 4793.06. As of January 28th, 2023 this record all time high still stands.

Milestone lows 
 March 9, 2009: S&P 500 closes at 676.53 (it hit a 666.79 intraday low on March 6), its closing low after the onset of the financial crisis of 2007–2008 and the bankruptcy of Lehman Brothers.

Milestone changes 
 October 19, 1987: S&P 500 registers its largest daily percentage loss, falling 20.47 percent. The one-day crash, known as "Black Monday," was blamed on program trading and those using a hedging strategy known as portfolio insurance. Despite the losses, the S&P 500 still closed positive for the year.
 February 5, 2018: After months of low volatility, S&P 500 registers a new largest daily point loss of 113.19 points, equivalent to more than 4%. Three days later, the index suffered another heavy loss of nearly the same amount.
 October 13, 2008: S&P 500 marks its best daily percentage gain, rising 11.58 percent. It also registers its then-largest single-day point increase of 104.13 points.
 December 26, 2018: While on pace for the worst December performance since the Great Depression, S&P 500 registers a new largest daily point gain of 116.60 points, which translates to roughly 5% on the index.
 December 31, 2008: For the year, S&P 500 falls 38.49 percent, its worst yearly percentage loss. In September 2008, Lehman Brothers collapsed as the financial crisis spread.
 March 16, 2020: The S&P 500 index suffered its worst daily decline since 1987's Black Monday, falling 9.5 percent, as a result of anxiety about the coronavirus pandemic. The decline of more than 20% since its peak, only 16 trading days earlier, signaled the start of a bear market closing at 2,480.64.

Records

Price index

Total return index
The total return index takes dividends into account.

Incremental closing milestones
The following is a list of the milestone closing levels of the S&P 500. 1-point increments are used up to the 20-point level; 2 to 50; 5 to 100; 10 to 500; 20 to 1,000; 50 to 3,000; and 100-point increments thereafter.  Bold formatting is applied to every five milestones, excluding peaks.

The Post-World War II Boom (1949–1966)

The 1970s Bear Market (1967–1973)

The Early 1980s Bull Depression (1980–1982)

The Mid-1980s Bull Market (1982–1987)

The 1990s Technology Bubble (1989–2000)

The Mid-2000s Cyclical Bull Market (2007)

The Mid 2010s Bull Market (2013-2020)

Bull Recession of 2020-21

List of 1000-point milestones by number of trading days

See also
 Closing milestones of the Dow Jones Industrial Average
 Closing milestones of the Nasdaq Composite
 List of largest daily changes in the S&P 500 Index
 Nasdaq-100#Record values
 Russell 3000 Index#Record values
 Wilshire 5000#Record High Wilshire 5000 Index Values

Notes

References

Economy-related lists of superlatives
S&P Dow Jones Indices